John Scott Thomas (born January 18, 1970) is an American former professional ice hockey right wing. He played 63 games in the National Hockey League with the Buffalo Sabres and Los Angeles Kings between 1992 and 2001. The rest of his career, which lasted from 1992 to 2003, was spent in the minor leagues.

Early life
Thomas was born in Buffalo, New York. He played in the 1983 Quebec International Pee-Wee Hockey Tournament with a minor ice hockey team from Buffalo.

Career 
Thomas was drafted in the third round, 56th overall, by the Buffalo Sabres in the 1989 NHL Entry Draft. He played 39 games with the Sabres over two seasons, 1992–93 and 1993–94.

Thomas then spent several seasons playing in the International Hockey League. He returned to the National Hockey League late in his career, appearing in 24 games with the Los Angeles Kings in 2000–01. Thomas scored the first goal of the "Stunner at Staples" play-off game in which Los Angeles rallied to beat the Detroit Red Wings after being down 3-0 with 6:07 remaining in the game. The Kings would eventually win the series in six games.

He finished his career as a member of the American Hockey League's Cleveland Barons in the 2002–03 season.

Thomas and Peter Ciavaglia had been the only two Buffalo-area natives to play for the Buffalo Sabres until Patrick Kaleta made his debut as a Sabre during the 2006–07 season. Tim Kennedy also played for his home town Buffalo Sabres.

Career statistics

Regular season and playoffs

Awards and honors

References

External links
 

1970 births
Living people
American men's ice hockey right wingers
Buffalo Sabres draft picks
Buffalo Sabres players
Cincinnati Cyclones (IHL) players
Clarkson Golden Knights men's ice hockey players
Cleveland Barons (2001–2006) players
Detroit Vipers players
Ice hockey people from Buffalo, New York
Long Beach Ice Dogs (IHL) players
Los Angeles Kings players
Manchester Monarchs (AHL) players
Manitoba Moose (IHL) players
Rochester Americans players